The 2016–17 Stanford Cardinal men's basketball team represented Stanford University during the 2016–17 NCAA Division I men's basketball season. The Cardinal were led by first-year head coach Jerod Haase. They played their home games at Maples Pavilion as members of the Pac-12 Conference. They finished the season 14–17, 6–12 in Pac-12 play to finish in a tie for ninth place. They lost in the first round of the Pac-12 tournament to Arizona State.

Previous season 
The Cardinal finished the 2015–16 season 15–15, 8–10 in Pac-12 play to finish in ninth place. They lost in the first round of the Pac-12 tournament to Washington. Stanford failed to receive an invite to the NCAA tournament and declined to participate in any other postseason tournament, marking the first time since 2011 that they would not participate in a postseason tournament.

On March 14, 2016, head coach Johnny Dawkins was fired after eight seasons. On March 25, the school hired Jerod Haase as head coach.

Offseason

Departures

2016 recruiting class

Roster

Schedule and results

|-
!colspan=12 style=| Non-conference regular season

|-
!colspan=12 style=| Pac-12 regular season

|-
!colspan=12 style=| Pac-12 tournament

References

Stanford Cardinal men's basketball seasons
Stanford